Centrolene antioquiensis (common name: Antioquia giant glass frog) is a species of frog in the family Centrolenidae.

Centrolene antioquiensis inhabits vegetation alongside streams in sub-Andean forests. Water pollution from agriculture, and more locally deforestation, threatens this species.

References

antioquiensis
Amphibians of the Andes
Amphibians of Colombia
Endemic fauna of Colombia
Taxonomy articles created by Polbot
Amphibians described in 1920
Taxobox binomials not recognized by IUCN